Martin Meier (born 27 April 1984) is a Swiss bobsledder. He competed in the four-man event at the 2018 Winter Olympics.

References

External links
 

1984 births
Living people
Swiss male bobsledders
Olympic bobsledders of Switzerland
Bobsledders at the 2018 Winter Olympics
Place of birth missing (living people)